Bernard John Digris (June 9, 1919 – November 1, 1979) was an American football offensive tackle/guard for the Chicago Bears and was a member of their 1943 NFL Championship team. Digris played in two games for the Bears during that year.

Early life and education
Digris attended high school in Ansonia, Connecticut where he is a member of Ansonia High School's sports hall of fame.

Digris was a graduate of Holy Cross in Worcester, Massachusetts where he captained their football team. He was the first graduate of Holy Cross on a football scholarship to leave with a degree other than Physical Education. His degree was in Chemistry.

After playing professional football Digris was a member of the United States Navy where he served in World War II.

References

1919 births
1979 deaths
People from Naugatuck, Connecticut
American football offensive linemen
College of the Holy Cross alumni
Chicago Bears players
United States Navy personnel of World War II